The 51027/51028 Mumbai Chhatrapati Shivaji Maharaj Terminus–Pandharpur Fast Passenger is an express train belonging to Indian Railways that runs between Mumbai Chhatrapati Shivaji Terminus and  in India. It operates as train number 51027 from Mumbai Chhatrapati Shivaji Maharaj Terminus to Pandharpur and as train number 51028 in the reverse direction.

Coaches

The 51027/51028 Mumbai CSMT–Pandharpur Fast Passenger presently has 1 AC 3 tier, 2 Sleeper Class & 6 General Unreserved coaches. As with most train services in India, coach composition may be amended at the discretion of Indian Railways depending on demand.

Service

The 51028 Mumbai CSMT–Pandharpur Fast Passenger covers the distance of 428 kilometres in 11h 35m (37.92 km/hr) & 11 hours 40 mins as 51028 Pandharpur–Mumbai CSMT Fast Passenger (39.57 km/hr).

As the average speed of the train is below 55 km/hr, as per Indian Railways rules, its fare does not include a Superfast surcharge.

Traction

It is hauled by 2 locomotive changes during its journey. A dual-traction WCAM-3 loco from  shed hauls the train from Mumbai CSMT until . Another -based WDM-3A takes over from Daund Junction until Pandharpur.

Timetable

51027 Mumbai CSMT–Pandharpur Fast Passenger leaves Mumbai CSMT every day at 22:55 hrs IST and reaches Pandharpur at 10:30 hrs IST the next day.

51028 Pandharpur–Mumbai CSMT Fast Passenger leaves Pandharpur every day at 17:25 hrs IST and reaches Mumbai CSMT at 04:10 hrs IST the next day.

See also
 Mumbai–Pune Passenger
 Mumbai CST–Sainagar Shirdi Fast Passenger

References

External links

Slow and fast passenger trains in India
Rail transport in Maharashtra